Toolesboro is an unincorporated community in southeastern Louisa County, Iowa, United States. 

The community is on Iowa Route X99 approximately seven miles southeast of Wapello and the Iowa River passes just to the east.

History
 
The Toolesboro Mound Group, a National Historic Landmark, lies north of the community.

Toolesboro was platted circa 1837 by William L. Toole.

References

Unincorporated communities in Louisa County, Iowa
Unincorporated communities in Iowa